Macrocneme lades is a moth of the subfamily Arctiinae. It was described by Pieter Cramer in 1775.

Description
The wings have a shining greenish steel color.

Distribution
This species cab be found in Mexico, Honduras, Guatemala, Costa Rica, Panama, Venezuela, Colombia, Suriname, Brazil (Espirito Santo, Para) and Peru.

References

  Retrieved April 21, 2018.

Macrocneme
Moths described in 1775
Taxa named by Pieter Cramer